Noland is a surname. Notable people with the surname (all American) include:

Cady Noland (born 1956), American conceptual sculptor
Charles Noland, American actor
James Ellsworth Noland, (1920–1992), U.S. Representative from Indiana
John Noland (1844–1908), Confederate black soldier
Kenneth Noland (1924–2010), American abstract painter
Mark Noland (born 1959), American politician
Michael Noland (born 1960), member of the Illinois Senate
Valora Noland (born 1941), American actress
William Churchill Noland (1865–1951), American architect